Vermund is a given name or surname. Notable people with the name include:

Given name
Vermund Larsen (1909–1970), Danish furniture designer and manufacturer.

Surname
Pernille Vermund (born 1975), Danish politician
Sten H. Vermund, American pediatrician and epidemiologist

Danish-language surnames
Danish masculine given names
Norwegian-language surnames